María de la O Lejárraga García (28 December 1874 – 28 June 1974), usually known in Spanish under the pseudonym María Martínez Sierra was a Spanish feminist writer, dramatist, translator and politician. She collaborated with her husband Gregorio Martínez Sierra.

Early years

María de la O Lejárraga was born into a wealthy family in  San Millán de la Cogolla (La Rioja). At the age of four, María and her family relocated to Carabanchel Bajo, because her father, Leandro Lejárraga, was a surgeon and practiced medicine in Madrid. María de la O Lejárraga's mother, Natividad García-Garay personally took care of her children's education and followed French educational programs.

María studied at the Asociación para la Enseñanza de la Mujer where she first came in contact with the pedagogical ideas of the Institución Libre de Enseñanza. She finished her studies in Commerce in 1891 and became an English professor at the Escuela de Institutrices y Comercio. María finalized her studies in education at the Escuela Normal in Madrid. As a student, María de la O Lejárraga attended the Congreso pedagogico Hispano-Americano, where she supported the educational postulates of Emilia Pardo Bazán. She worked as a teacher between 1897 and 1907.

In 1905, María de la O Lejárraga traveled to Belgium with a scholarship that allowed her to study the educational systems of that country. During her time in Belgium, she also learned about the Casas del Pueblo and the socialist theses. However, her literary concerns clashed with the society that she grew up in and was closed to the idea that women could dedicate themselves to the arts and sciences.

Marriage and theatrical success

In 1899, María de la O Lejárraga published her first work: Cuentos breves, which was coldly received by her family. In 1900, María married Gregorio Martínez Sierra, with whom she collaborated as a co-author on all the plays that were publicly credited to him alone (she was the main author of the plays, but the plot was usually agreed between both). María de la O Lejárraga, chose to use her husband's name instead of her own. This was prompted because her family did not agree or approve of her publishing pieces of work and because of her career as a teacher. In 1901, María and her husband published Vida Moderna, in which they published both modernist and realist authors alike.

Alongside, Juan Ramón Jiménez, Gregorio and María founded Helios (1903-1904), a magazine dedicated to poetic modernism, where they published, Emilia Pardo Bazán, Antonio Machado, Jacinto Benavente , and the Quintero brothers, among others. In 1907, they also founded the magazine, Renacimiento, of short duration but great quality. These collaborations cemented a (profundo) friendship between Lejárraga and Juan Ramón Jiménez. Both publications were aware of European literary trends. Lejárraga was a polyglot and was the one who made most of the English translations and some French ones that appeared in the Renacimiento.

María de la O left her teaching work and took a leave of absence in 1908 to dedicate herself fully to her literature. Her play, Canción de cuna, which premiered in 1911, received the award from the Real Academia Española as the best work of the theatrical session of 1910 to 1911. Of all of the plays staged in Madrid, at least 20 were plays written by María de la O Lejárraga. In addition, the "Compañía cómico-dramática Martínez Sierra", directed by her husband, not only performed in Spain but also made several tours in France, Great Britain, The United States, and Latin America. Both María and Gregorio's name appeared on the performance programs. María was also in charge of her husbands theater, the Teatro Lara, when Gregorio was away.

María de la O Lejárraga also collaborated with established writers such as Eduardo Marquina, on his work El pavo real and Carlos Arniches, in La chica del gato, which was later taken to the cinema. In 1914, María de la O Lejárraga produced Margot, with music by Joaquín Turina, in a three act lyrical drama.

Both María and her husband came in contact with Manuel de Falla in Paris in 1913 at the request of Joaquín Turina. When Falla returned to Madrid, they began collaborate on various projects including El amor brujo which premiered in 1915 in the Teatro Lara de Madrid with Pastora Imperio in the main role. El amor brujo combined music and dance from Manuel de Falla and scripts from María de la O Lejárraga.

Feminism and politics 
During the 1920s and 1930s Lejárraga was active in many feminist activist groups. 
She became secretary of the Spanish branch of the International Woman Suffrage Alliance.
When the Women's Alliance for Civic Education was formed in 1930, she was the first president. In the 1933 Spanish general election María Lejárraga was elected to Congress as a Socialist Party representative for Granada.
In mid-1933 the World Committee Against War and Fascism sent a delegation to Spain to contact women interested in forming a local branch.
Dolores Ibárruri, Encarnación Fuyola, Lucía Barón and Irene Falcón formed the National Committee of Women Against War and Fascism.
María Lejárraga helped them contact Republican and Socialist women for this cause.

María Lejárraga resigned from Parliament after the harsh government action during the Asturian miners' strike of 1934.
At the start of the Spanish Civil War (1936–39) she was sent to Switzerland by the Republican government as the commercial attaché. In 1938 she moved to France, then moved to New York, Los Angeles, Mexico, and finally in 1953 to Buenos Aires, Argentina where she died in poverty there in 1974.

Exile and death 
After Martínez Sierra's death she published a memoir entitled Gregorio y yo ('Gregorio and I', 1953) in which she reveals proof of the authorship.

María worked as a translator all her life - from the first translations published anonymously (Librería extranjera de Leonardo Williams, Vida Moderna, Helios) and the translations published under the name María Martínez Sierra for Garnier Publishing House in the early 1900s, to the many theatre translations published under her husband's name from 1915 to 1930, and the translations of prose and theatre published in her exile in Argentina (1950-1974) that helped her earn her living until her death. As she said in a letter to María Lacrampe in 1962: "Translating, for a writer familiar with the business, is an exquisite form of laziness. The other is reading" (Traducir, para un escritor que sabe su oficio, es una forma exquisita de pereza. La otra es leer).

Plagiarism from Walt Disney 
Lejárraga through her translator Collice Portnoff, sent in 1951 to Walt Disney the handwritten story Merlín y Viviana, in which she tells the story of a Dog falling in love with a vain female Cat, trying to see if he liked it for a movie . Two months later Disney sent it back. In 1955 premiered lady and the tramp in which there was some similarities. In a letter the translator talks about it: "We sent it to Walt Disney, hold it for a couple of months and gave it back saying they didn't take non requested scripts. Later, made a movie, lady and the tramp, which was the same story, only changing the cat for a female dog . This time i didn't wanted to protest, What for?".

Selected works

 Cuentos breves (1899)
 La mujer ante la República (1931)
 Una mujer por caminos de España (1952)
 Gregorio y yo (1953)
 Viajes de una gota de agua (1954)
 Fiesta en el Olimpo (1960)

See also 

 Carmen de Burgos
 Clara Campoamor
 Women's suffrage

Notes

References

 
 

 

1874 births
1974 deaths
People from La Rioja
Spanish Socialist Workers' Party politicians
Spanish dramatists and playwrights
Spanish feminists
Spanish socialist feminists
Exiles of the Spanish Civil War in Switzerland
Burials at La Chacarita Cemetery
Exiles of the Spanish Civil War in Mexico
Exiles of the Spanish Civil War in Argentina
Exiles of the Spanish Civil War in the United States
Exiles of the Spanish Civil War in France
Members of the Congress of Deputies of the Second Spanish Republic